Parkerville is a city in Morris County, Kansas, United States.  As of the 2020 census, the population of the city was 46.

History
A post office was established in Parkersville on August 9, 1870, then renamed to Parkerville on June 23, 1892.  The post office closed on October 31, 1953. The city was incorporated as Parkerville in 1871.  Parkerville was named for Charles G. Parker, a pioneer settler.

Geography
Parkerville is located at  (38.764622, -96.662441).

Demographics

2010 census
As of the census of 2010, there were 59 people, 25 households, and 17 families residing in the city. The racial makeup of the city was 81.4% White, 13.6% from other races, and 5.1% from two or more races. Hispanic or Latino of any race were 13.6% of the population.

There were 25 households, of which 32.0% had children under the age of 18 living with them, 52.0% were married couples living together, 8.0% had a female householder with no husband present, 8.0% had a male householder with no wife present, and 32.0% were non-families. 24.0% of all households were made up of individuals, and 4% had someone living alone who was 65 years of age or older. The average household size was 2.36 and the average family size was 2.82.

The median age in the city was 34.3 years. 22% of residents were under the age of 18; 8.6% were between the ages of 18 and 24; 37.4% were from 25 to 44; 20.4% were from 45 to 64; and 11.9% were 65 years of age or older. The gender makeup of the city was 50.8% male and 49.2% female.

2000 census
As of the census of 2000, there were 73 people, 22 households, and 17 families residing in the city. The racial makeup of the city was 98.63% White, 1.37% from other races. Hispanic or Hispanic of any race were 6.85% of the population.

There were 22 households, out of which 50.0% had children under the age of 18 living with them, 72.7% were married couples living together, 14.5% had a female householder with no husband present, and 22.7% were non-families. 18.2% of all households were made up of individuals, and none had someone living alone who was 65 years of age or older. The average household size was 3.32 and the average family size was 3.94.

In the city, the population was spread out, with 42.5% under the age of 18, 5.5% from 18 to 24, 23.3% from 25 to 44, 17.8% from 45 to 64, and 11.0% who were 65 years of age or older. The median age was 26 years. For every 100 females, there were 121.2 males. For every 100 females age 18 and over, there were 110.0 males.

The median income for a household in the city was $29,375, and the median income for a family was $32,188. Males had a median income of $17,292 versus $0 for females. The per capita income for the city was $9,792. None of the population and none of the families were below the poverty line.

Education
The community is served by Rural Vista USD 481 public school district.

References

Further reading

External links

 Parkerville - Directory of Public Officials
 Parkerville history
 Parkerville city map, KDOT
 Topo Map of White City / Parkerville area, USGS

Cities in Morris County, Kansas
Cities in Kansas